The Grammy Award for Best Rock Performance by a Duo or Group with Vocal was awarded between 1980 and 2011.

The award was discontinued after the 2011 award season in a major overhaul of Grammy categories. Beginning in 2012, all solo or duo/group performances (including instrumental performance) in the rock category were shifted to the newly formed Best Rock Performance category.

U2 holds the record for most awards with a total of seven, followed by Aerosmith with a total of four.

Recipients

 Each year is linked to the article about the Grammy Awards held that year.

See also
 List of Grammy Award categories

References

  Note: User must select the "Rock" category as the genre under the search feature.

External links
Official site of the Grammy Awards

Grammy Awards for rock music
Awards disestablished in 2011
Awards established in 1980
Music-related lists